Chapter 10: State Services.  Chapter 10 of the 1997 Constitution of Fiji is titled State Services.  Its fifteen sections establish certain civil service offices, specify their functions and jurisdictions, set out the qualifications and preconditions required of persons holding such offices, and prescribes the manner of their appointment.

Section 140 lays down the basic principles for the recruitment and promotion of state officers.  With the objective of implementing government policies as effectively and efficiently as possible, appointments are to be made on merit, but care is to be taken to ensure equality of opportunity for both men and women, and for members of all ethnic groups.  All levels of the state service should reflect the ethnic composition of the population.  However, occupational preferences should also be taken into account when appropriate.  This is a recognition that for cultural or religious reasons, certain ethnic groups may disproportionately choose or eschew certain occupations.

Section 141 requires all public office holders, except judges, to be citizens, although exceptions are allowed for with the specific approval of the Prime Minister.

Sections 142 through 145 establish several "independent service commissions."  A new body, a three-member Constitutional Offices Commission is established for the first time; two other bodies, the Public Service Commission (four to six members) and the Disciplined Services Commission (three members, formerly known as the Police Service Commission), both established by the former 1990 constitution, are continued in existence.

All appointments to the three Commissions are made by the President of Fiji on the advice of the Cabinet Minister responsible for the civil service, following consultation by the latter with the appropriate Parliamentary committee, which is empowered to confirm or veto the nomination.

In the event of a vacancy or of a Commissioner being unable to carry out his or her duties owing to absence, illness, or any other cause, the Prime Minister may, after consulting with the Leader of the Opposition, advise the President to appoint someone to act in his or her capacity in the interim.  If the office of the chairperson of any of the commissions is vacant, or if the chairperson is unable to perform his or her duties for any reason, the remaining members may elect a temporary chairperson from among themselves.

The section disqualifies from membership of an independent service commission persons who are, or have been in the three years prior to appointment:
 Members of, or candidates for, the House of Representatives or the Senate, or any local authority or representative body.
 National office bearers of a political party which has contested a general election or a byelection in the said three-year period.
 Holders of other public offices.
 Members of either of the other two independent service commissions.  The chairpersons of the commissions are exempt from this rule, however.

The section further forbids the appointment of members of any independent service commission to any other state service during their tenure as commissioners, or for three years after the expiry of their term.  These disqualifications are intended to safeguard the independence of the commissions from political interference, and to forestall any potential abuse of office by a commissioner to secure appointment to another office.

Section 146 specifies the functions of the Constitutional Offices Commission and empowers it to appoint the Supervisor of Elections, the Ombudsman, the Auditor-General, the Director of Public Prosecutions, the Secretary-General to Parliament, and the Commissioner of Police.  In consultation with the applicable Cabinet Minister and with the Board of the Reserve Bank, the Constitutional Offices Commission also appoints the  Governor of the Reserve Bank; this last office is declared not to be a public office.

Sections 147 through 151 specify the functions of the Public Service Commission.  It is empowered to appoint, remove, and take disciplinary action against holders of public offices.

Offices that are explicitly excluded from the jurisdiction of the Public Service Commission include judges, offices for which the Constitutional Offices Commission or the Disciplined Services Commission are responsible, offices which come under the jurisdiction of the Judicial Service Commission or of any body prescribed by Parliament, military offices, and all offices referred to in the Constitution, except for the Secretary to the House of Representatives and the Secretary to the Senate.  With the agreement of the Cabinet Minister responsible for the civil service, the Public Service Commission may choose not to exercise its prerogatives; Parliament then has two sitting days to allow or disallow that decision.

There are certain limitations on the powers of the Public Service Commission.  No holder of an office under the direct control of the President, the Secretary of the House of Representatives or of the Senate, the Ombudsman, or the Auditor-General, may be appointed, removed, or disciplined, without the approval of the person to whom the office holder is responsible.  The Prime Minister must approve all appointments to the positions of Secretary (head) of a government department, or of Secretary to the Cabinet.  The Prime Minister and the Leader of the Opposition must both be consulted over the appointment of members of agricultural tribunals (other than the Central Agricultural Tribunal) under the Agricultural Landlord and Tenant Act (Fiji), although neither has a veto.

Ambassadors and other diplomats are appointed and removed by the President, on the advice of the Prime Minister.  If the person to be appointed as an ambassador or diplomat is a member of a state service, the Prime Minister must consult the Public Service Commission.

Parliament is empowered to specify pensions for ambassadors and diplomats who have been removed from office.  It may also authorize the Prime Minister, or another Minister, to transfer holders of public officers to specific roles in department responsible for foreign affairs; in some cases, these may be required to live outside of Fiji.

Subject to conditions imposed by Parliament, the Public Service Commission may delegate to one of its members or officers, or to the holder of any public office, any or all of its functions except its responsibility to appoint, remove, or discipline members of agricultural tribunals, a Secretary of a government department or any person acting in that capacity, and the Secretary to the Cabinet.

Parliament may make laws to provide for appeals against decisions of the Public Service Commission, and may set up a relevant body to hear such appeals.

Sections 152 through 154 specify the functions of Disciplined Services Commission.  It is empowered to make appoint, remove, or discipline officers of the police force and the prisons service. The Commissioner of Police and officers holding any rank equal or inferior to senior inspector are excluded from this provision. The Commissioner of Police, rather than the Disciplined Services Commission, exercises authority over such officers; although the decision to dismiss or demote any police officer requires the approval of the Commission .

Subject to conditions prescribed by Parliament, the Disciplined Service Commission may delegate any or all of its powers to one of its members.  It may also delegate to the Commissioner of Police or the Commissioner of Prisons any or all of its powers in relation the police force or the prisons service, respectively. The Prime Minister must approve, in writing, any delegation of powers to the Commissioner of Police.

Section 155 clarifies that for the purposes of this chapter, "independent service commission" means the Constitutional Offices Commission, the Public Service Commission, or the Disciplined Services Commission.

1997 Constitution of Fiji